This is a list of notable past and present residents of the U.S. city of Santa Ana, California, and its surrounding metropolitan area.

Athletics

 Stephen Abas (born January 12, 1978) – three-time NCAA champion wrestler and Olympic silver medalist for the United States in freestyle wrestling
 Ben Agajanian (born August 28, 1919) – collegiate and professional football player
 David Aldana (born November 26, 1949) – motorcycle racer
 Bob Ammann (born May 27, 1965) – soccer goalkeeper
 Daniel Antúnez (born February 10, 1986) – soccer midfielder
 Victor Auer (March 24, 1937 – May 3, 2011) – sports shooter and Olympic medalist for the United States
 Bill Bean (born May 11, 1964) – Major League Baseball player
 Richard Bivens (born August 26, 1979) – Musician
 Eddie Bockman (July 26, 1920 – September 29, 2011) – professional baseball player and scout
 Cedric Bozeman – basketball player
 Isaac Curtis (born October 20, 1950) – professional football wide receiver
 Don Davis (born December 16, 1943) – professional football defensive tackle
 Fumio Demura (born September 15, 1938) – master of karate and kobudo (weaponry)
 Cynthia Denzler (born May 12, 1983) – alpine skier
 Sandro Dias (born April 18, 1975) – professional vert skateboarder
 Lenny Dykstra (born February 10, 1963) – MLB center fielder
 Don Edmunds (born September 23, 1930) – race car driver and car builder
 Clancy Edwards (born August 9, 1955) – track and field sprinter
 Danny Espinosa (born April 25, 1987) – second baseman for Washington Nationals, Los Angeles Angels
 Hebron Fangupo (born July 19, 1985) – football nose tackle
 Ben Francisco (born October 23, 1981) – professional baseball outfielder
 David Gibson (born November 5, 1977) – NFL safety
 Khaled Holmes (born January 19, 1990) – USC and NFL center
 Rosie Jones (born November 13, 1959) – professional golfer
 Jeff Kemp (born July 11, 1959) – NFL football quarterback
 Matt Leinart (born May 11, 1983) – USC and NFL football quarterback
 Colin Long (born June 19, 1989) – professional ice hockey center and assistant coach
 Larry Lutz (1913–1998) – football player and coach
 Jeff MacPherson (born June 9, 1956) – driver
 Jamie Martin (born February 8, 1970) – quarterback of NFL and NFL Europe
 Gilbert Melendez (born April 12, 1982) – mixed martial artist
 Yaotzin Meza (born February 4, 1981) – mixed martial artist
 Donn Moomaw (born October 15, 1931) – football player and Presbyterian minister
 Kim Mulkey (born May 17, 1962) – women's head basketball coach at Baylor University
 Jack Musick (c. 1925 – November 27, 1977) – football player and coach
 Billy Preston – basketball player
 Christian Ramirez (born April 4, 1991) – soccer player
 Erasmo Ramirez (born April 29, 1976) – MLB left-handed relief pitcher
 Ronny Rios (born January 22, 1990) – professional boxer
 Jeff Robinson (born December 13, 1960) – MLB right-handed pitcher
 Jesse Ruíz (born July 31, 1985) – wrestler
 Marlene Sandoval (born January 18, 1984) – football defender and member of Mexico women's national team
 Bryan Save (born December 16, 1981) – football defensive tackle
 Nick Scandone (March 4, 1966 – January 2, 2009) – yachtsman
 Paul Soliai (born December 30, 1983) – football defensive tackle
 Dave Stieb (born July 22, 1957) – MLB right-handed pitcher
 Kelly Talavou (born October 4, 1984) – football defensive tackle
 Stephen Tepper (born March 10, 1969) – ice hockey right wing 
 Lenny Vandermade (born January 3, 1981) – football coach
 Mitch Williams (born November 17, 1964) – MLB relief pitcher and TV commentator

Film, television and theatre

 Wade Boteler (October 3, 1888 – May 7, 1943) – actor
 Dale Fuller (June 17, 1885 – October 14, 1948) – actress of the silent era
 Brett Halsey (born June 20, 1933) – actor
 Michael B. Jordan (born February 9, 1987) – actor
 Diane Keaton (born January 5, 1946) – actress
 Louie Olivos Jr. – actor, producer, director, and playwright
 Michelle Pfeiffer (born April 29, 1958) – actress and singer
 John Raitt (January 29, 1917 – February 20, 2005) – actor and singer
 Robert Webber (October 14, 1924 – May 19, 1989) – actor

Music

 Manuela Budrow (1876–1966) – vocalist, composer, music educator based in Santa Ana after 1923
 Roy Estrada (born April 17, 1943) – bassist, singer-songwriter, record producer, actor and convicted child molester, bassist with Frank Zappa, Mothers of Invention, Little Feat and Captain Beefheart
 Dinah Jane Hansen (born June 22, 1997) – singer, member of girl group Fifth Harmony
 Bill Medley (born September 19, 1940) – singer, one half of the Righteous Brothers
 Mr. Mixx (born September 23, 1963) – rapper
 Duke Montana (born February 7, 1975) – Italian-American rapper 
 Lindsey Stirling (born September 21, 1986) – violinist, YouTuber, singer-songwriter

Politics

 Lou Correa (born January 24, 1958) – California senator; lives in Santa Ana
 Miguel A. Pulido (1956) – politician
 William H. Spurgeon (October 10, 1829 – June 20, 1915) – founder of Santa Ana

Visual Artists

 Kimberly Duran (1989) – "Shmi," Chicana muralist 
 Carlee Fernández (1973)  – Sculptor and photographer

See also

 List of people from California

References

Santa Ana, California
Santa Ana